(born 9 May 1977) is a Japanese singer-songwriter and former actress. Andō is part of the Horipro talent agency.

Biography

Early life and career
Born in Kanagawa Prefecture, as a child, music was never a special hobby of Andō; rather she had more of an interest towards drawing. During her college years, driven by her strong interest in creating things, Andō decided to pursue a film making career. However, unable to catch a break with the studios, she then followed her friends and family's advice to join a talent agency in hopes of becoming an actor. This landed her a few spots as an extra in TV dramas.

One of the auditions for a play she passed during her Junior year at Ferris University required her to sing on stage. At that time, one of the evaluators was Oricon music charts founder Sōkō Koike and by his recommendation, she decided to pursue a career as a singer-songwriter.

Before debuting as a singer, Andō appeared as a regular in the popular TV drama "Ikebukuro West Gate Park" (2000) and the 1999 movie "Saimin".

Debut and success
In 2002, Andō sent film director Yukihiko Tsutsumi, whom she had gotten to know on the set of "Ikebukuro West Gate Park" a demo tape of "Rinjin ni Hikari ga Sasu Toki". Upon hearing her demo, Tsutsumi decided he had to include it in the movie he was then directing, 2LDK, as ending theme.

In July 2003, Andō debuted under the Avex-owned sub-label, Cutting Edge, with the mini album "Sally". That same year she performed live for the first time at a convention concert held for Avex shareholders.

In November 2005, Andō's "Nouzenkatsura (Reprise)" was used in Gekkeikan's commercial for the "Tsuki" liquor. Because Andō was not credited on the actual commercial, the company was flooded with inquiries from people wanting to know the name of the singer, who for a period was confused to be Clammbon's Ikuko Harada. The song, based on a poem written by her grandmother over the loss of her husband, propelled Andō's second full album, Merry Andrew into the Top 10. The album was certified gold with over 100,000 copies sold. Following the success of the song, Andō was branded by the media as the "late-blooming princess" and "singer-songwriter of the next generation".

In December 2006, Andō embarked on her first live tour.

In April 2009, she released her first compilation album which featured a variety of songs handpicked by Andō herself. That same year, she wrote and performed the ending theme song, "Paxmaveiti", for the Nintendo DS video game Professor Layton and the Last Specter. On 8 August 2010, she appeared at the World Happiness 2010 rock festival in Tokyo.

Artistry

Recording process
Andō writes and composes almost all of her songs, except for the occasional covers and collaborations with other artists. Andō's recording process consists of writing lyrics and composing melodies which she then records a cappella and passes over to Ryūji Yamamoto who is responsible for all her songs' arrangements. Yamamoto arranges Ando's demos based on these recordings. Pre-production meetings are held with Yamamoto, Andō and her producer, Yuji Andō, where they decide on the final direction for a track and select the musicians for the recording.

Influences
Like many other singer-songwriters before her, Ando's greatest influence is Chara, whom she first discovered through a friend in high school. For her big audition at Avex, Andō sang Chara's "Break These Chain". Another artist Andō listens to and lists as influence is Naoko Ken. Her lyrics tend to have happy endings. This has also been remarked in an interview by movie director and friend Yukihiko Tsutsumi, when he called her a "big happy end freak". Another influence is Yellow Magic Orchestra, whose 1983 song "Kimi ni Mune Kyun" she covered in her 2009 record Paxmaveiti.

Collaborations
In recent years, Andō has started composing and writing for other artists, such as Yui Aragaki and Hisayo Inamori, as well as collaborating with them on her own songs. Andō also often records covers of songs from the 70's and 80's for her singles which she calls the "serious adult covers series".

Character
 Since her debut, Andō has been blogging on her official website under the name of "Nee-yan", which her staff and fans have adopted as a nickname for her.
 She has a hard time managing stress and pressure and is said to often feel ill and nervous before going on stage. She enjoys performing however dislikes MC-ing.
 The only instrument she can play is the basic rhythm guitar.
 On her radio show, she is known for answering her listeners' questions in a very direct and honest manner.
 Ever since her debut, Andō has taken charge of her own make-up and styling. This has appealed to female fans and landed her many fashion magazine gigs.
 On her first appearance on the Music Station television program, she revealed she that prefers staying indoors and seldom leaves her home.
 Andō takes part in the creative process for many of her music videos and has collaborated with many directors on MVs such as "Sally", "Dramatic Record", "Wasuremono no Mori", "Rinjin ni Hikari ga Sasu Toki" and "Utai Zen'ya". She also draws many of her CD covers, for which she is credited as Üchary Andrew.
 As a child she loved watching the Kon Ichikawa directed "Kosuke Kindaichi" series and since then has been a fan of novelist Seishi Yokomizo's work, to the point of creating a special corner called  on her J-Wave radio show "Oh! My Radio" .
 She attended the same middle and high school as fellow singer-songwriter Hitoto Yo.
 Yukihiko Tsutsumi is often seen at her concerts and has branded her the "best female singer of the last few years" on his blog.
 She is allergic to crustaceans and therefore does not eat lobster or crab. She also dislikes bananas.
 She often cuts her hair haphazardly, which she ends up regretting most of the time.
 When driving her car, she gets angry easily, and when she is, she switches to the Kansai dialect, which she was brought up speaking.
 She dreams of one day building a home where she can live happily with her family.
 On the morning show "Mezamashi TV", she commented on sharing the same name pronunciation as news anchor Yūko Andō, saying "I feel inexcusable for having the same name as such a well-rounded person, (compared) I'm a pretty useless human being".
 In May 2011, she announced that she was pregnant with her first child on her official blog. Ando announced the birth of the child in the October of the same year.

Discography

Singles

Studio albums

Albums

Mini albums
Sally (9 July 2003)
And Do, Record. (28 January 2004)
Acoustic Tempo Magic. (12 March 2014)

Cover albums
Otona no Majime na Cover Series (2 March 2011)

Compilation
The Best '03-'09 (15 April 2009)

DVDs
The Moon and the Sun. (19 April 2006)
Tour 2008 "Encyclopedia." Final (7 January 2009)

Piano Score
Yuko Ando Selection For Piano (22 July 2006)

Filmography

Acting

Movies
 Mamotte Agetai! (1999)
 Saimin (1999)
 A Drop of the Grapevine (2014)
 And So the Baton Is Passed (2021)

TV
 Ikebukuro West Gate Park (2000)

Commercial
 Hitachi au W32H
 Sapporo Beverage Co., Ltd. Gerolsteiner

Theme songs
 Film "2LDK" (2003) - End theme song "Rinjin ni hikari ga sasu toki"
 TV series "Meteor Garden" (2001) - End theme song for BS TV "Sally"
 TV series "Gilgamesh" (2003) - End theme song "Wasuremono no Mori"
 Film "Jigyaku no Uta" (2007) - Title song "Unabara no Tsuki"
 Video game "Professor Layton and the Last Specter" - Title song "Paxmaveiti"
 TV series "Attack on Titan: The Final Season" (2020) - End theme song "Shōgeki"

Radio
Splash Dream (Date FM, February 2004)
Middle Tempo Magic (North Wave, July–December 2004)
Oh! My Radio (J-Wave, October 2006 – March 2007)

See also
List of J-pop artists

References

External links
 Andrew Page Yuko Ando Official Site
 

1977 births
Living people
Avex Group artists
Japanese women pop singers
Actresses from Kanagawa Prefecture
Musicians from Kanagawa Prefecture
Japanese women singer-songwriters
Japanese singer-songwriters
20th-century Japanese actresses
21st-century Japanese women singers
21st-century Japanese singers
Ferris University alumni